Kevin B. "Mac" McMullan is an American baseball coach, currently the assistant baseball coach for the University of Virginia Cavaliers of the National Collegiate Athletic Association (NCAA).

As a member of the Cavaliers baseball coaching staff, McMullan recruits and trains players to develop the quality of the baseball program at the university; under his tutelage baseball classes have achieved rankings of 12th (2004), 10th (2005), 8th (2006), 13th (2007), and 14th (2008) in inter-college NCAA competitions. Four of five teams coached by McMullan have been placed in USA's top 40 for fielding percentage.

Biography
Raised in Dumont, New Jersey, McMullan graduated from Dumont High School. He studied at the Indiana University of Pennsylvania, where he was a multi-sport athlete.  He played as catcher for the IUP baseball baseball team and as linebacker for the IUP football team; he was awarded the honor of All-American for both sports. During his college career, he was a part of six championship teams at IUP. After graduating in 1990 he became a professional baseball player for the New York Yankees (1990–92) and the Salt Lake City Trappers (1990 and 1992). In 1990, he was a Pioneer League All-Star with the Trappers.

McMullan began coaching on the University of Virginia baseball program in 2003. Previously he had coached within other college programs and was a manager and coordinator for the Atlanta Braves, coaching the club's catchers and hitters during spring training. In 2009, he was named the ABCA/Baseball America Assistant Coach of the Year.

In 2001–02, he was a recruiting coordinator, hitting coach, and catching instructor for the Pirates, East Carolina University's baseball team; he later became the Pirate's acting head coach. Under McMullan's three-year tenure, the Pirates recorded 138 wins and 46 losses, finished within the top 25 teams each year, and won three conference championships and an NCAA Regional Championship.

Players coached by McMullan have gone on to play in Major League Baseball, including Ryan Zimmerman (Washington Nationals), Mark Reynolds (Arizona Diamondbacks) and Joe Koshansky (Colorado Rockies).

References

External links

Sweep confirms potential – Al Myatt 2011, retrieved March 12, 2011
Kevin McMullan biography: northjersey.com, retrieved March 12, 2011
All Star Baseball Academy 2009, retrieved March 12, 2011

1968 births
Living people
Baseball players from New Jersey
Dumont High School alumni
IUP Crimson Hawks football players
IUP Crimson Hawks baseball players
Salt Lake City Trappers players
Fort Lauderdale Yankees players
Greensboro Hornets players
IUP Crimson Hawks baseball coaches
St. John's Red Storm baseball coaches
East Carolina Pirates baseball coaches
Virginia Cavaliers baseball coaches
American football linebackers
People from Dumont, New Jersey
Players of American football from New Jersey
Sportspeople from Bergen County, New Jersey